Rowing at the 2001 Southeast Asian Games was held from September 10 to September 13. All events were held at the Batu Dam, Selangor, Malaysia.

Medalists

Men

Women

Medal table
Legend

References

External links
 

2001
Southeast Asian Games
2001 Southeast Asian Games events